Kaukajärvi is a Finnish lake in Pirkanmaa (also known as the Tampere Region).

The municipalities of Tampere and Kangasala adjoin the lake. Kaukajärvi was the venue for the 1977 World Rowing Junior Championships and the 1995 World Rowing Championships.

References

Lakes of Tampere
Lakes of Kangasala